George Nicholson (born 23 April 1937) is a British sailor. He is the son of Charles A Nicholson, a yacht designer, and great nephew of Charles E Nicholson, also a yacht designer. We worked for Camper and Nicholsons the yacht builders. He competed in the 5.5 Metre event at the 1960 Summer Olympics.

References

External links
 

1937 births
Living people
British male sailors (sport)
Olympic sailors of Great Britain
Sailors at the 1960 Summer Olympics – 5.5 Metre
Sportspeople from Southampton